Thomistic sacramental theology is St. Thomas Aquinas's theology of the sacraments of the Catholic Church. It can be found through his writings in the Summa contra Gentiles and in the Summa Theologiæ.

General view of the sacraments

In the Catholic Church, there are seven sacraments:  Baptism, Confirmation, Holy Eucharist, Penance, Extreme unction (Anointing of the Sick), Holy Orders, Matrimony.  

From Summa Contra Gentiles, Book 4:

Aquina also states, in the Summa Theologica: "a sacrament is nothing else than a sanctification conferred on man with some outward sign. Wherefore, since by receiving orders a consecration is conferred on man by visible signs, it is clear that Order is a sacrament."

See also

 Anointing of the Sick in the Catholic Church
 Baptism (Catholic Church)
 Confirmation in the Catholic Church
 Eucharist in the Catholic Church
 Ex opere operato
 Holy orders in the Catholic Church
 Marriage in the Catholic Church
 Penance
 Sacramental matter and form
 Scholasticism
 Thought of Thomas Aquinas
 Validity and liceity (Catholic Church)

References

Further reading
 
 
 

Sacramental theology
Philosophy of religion
S